Kulvietis is a Lithuanian surname, literally meaning someone from Kulva.

Abraomas Kulvietis (1509-1545), Lithuanian jurist and a professor
Saulius Kulvietis (born 1991),  Lithuanian basketball player

See also

References

Lithuanian-language surnames
Toponymic surnames

lt:Kulvietis